Thamar, The Child of the Mountains (German:Thamar, das Kind der Berge) is a 1924 German silent film directed by Robert Dinesen and starring Lya De Putti, Paul Otto and Anton Pointner.

The film's sets were designed by the art director Willi Herrmann.

Cast
 Lya De Putti as Thamar - Graf Daniloffs Schwester 
 Paul Otto as Graf Daniloff  
 Anton Pointner as Frank Bondy - Ingenieur  
 Alfred Haase as Graf Menschikeff  
 Harry Hardt as Taegar - Ingenieur  
 Sylvia Torf as Minka  
 Alfred Kern as Diener 
 Max Maximilian

References

Bibliography
 Bock, Hans-Michael & Bergfelder, Tim. The Concise CineGraph. Encyclopedia of German Cinema. Berghahn Books, 2009.

External links

1924 films
Films of the Weimar Republic
Films directed by Robert Dinesen
German silent feature films
German black-and-white films
Phoebus Film films